Kenneth Marshall (born 27 February 1935) is a South African cricketer. He played in five first-class matches for Border from 1963/64 to 1967/68.

See also
 List of Border representative cricketers

References

External links
 

1935 births
Border cricketers
Living people
South African cricketers